Turnera hindsiana is a species of plant in the family Passifloraceae. It is endemic to Ecuador.  Its natural habitat is subtropical or tropical moist lowland forests.

References

Endemic flora of Ecuador
Endangered plants
hindsiana
Taxonomy articles created by Polbot